Thomas Lejdström (born 31 May 1962) is a former Swedish freestyle and medley swimmer, who competed in the 1980 and 1984  Summer Olympics.

In 1984 Lejdström won a bronze medal in 4×100 m freestyle relay along with Bengt Baron, Mikael Örn and Per Johansson. Nicknamed Lejan his best individual result at the Olympics is a 7th place at 200 m freestyle in 1980.

Lejdström is the father of the Swedish Youth Olympics swimmer Gustav Åberg Lejdström.

Personal bests

Long course (50 m)

Clubs
Västerås SS

References
Profile

1962 births
Swedish male butterfly swimmers
Olympic swimmers of Sweden
Swimmers at the 1980 Summer Olympics
Swimmers at the 1984 Summer Olympics
Olympic bronze medalists for Sweden
Living people
University of California, Berkeley alumni
Olympic bronze medalists in swimming
Swedish male freestyle swimmers
European Aquatics Championships medalists in swimming
California Golden Bears men's swimmers
Västerås SS swimmers
Medalists at the 1984 Summer Olympics
Swedish male medley swimmers
Sportspeople from Västerås